Juan Alonso may refer to:
 Juan Alonso (footballer, born 1927), Spanish footballer
 Juan Alonso (footballer, born 1998), Mexican footballer
 Juan Alonso, Mayagüez, Puerto Rico, a barrio in the municipality of Mayagüez, Puerto Rico

See also
 Juan Alonzo (born 1911), Cuban footballer.